Sembattai is a 2012 Indian Tamil-language drama film directed by I. Ganesh and starring Dhileepan (previously credited as Bala), Sreejit and Gowri Nambiar.
 
The film's lead actor, Dhileepan died a week after the film's release.

Cast 
Dhileepan as Sembattai 
Sreejit as Kayamboo
Gowri Nambiar as Anandi
Kandasamy as Ayyavu
George Rajan as Irulandi 
Cheranraj as Shankaralingam

Production 
The film's director I. Ganesh worked under Fazil and Siddique. This film marks the debut of Gowri Nambiar, cousin of Karthika Nair.

Soundtrack 
Music by Sreeraghav.
"Kattumaram" sung by Mahalakshmi Krishnan 
"Kadalodu" sung by N. Srinivasan, Deepank, G.J. Siva, Sreeraghav and Chandrayee
"Thaiyara Thaiya"
 "Muthe Muthe" sung by Vijay Yesudas
 "Uthu Uthu" sung by Maya Sricharan and Chandrayee
 "Sumaithangi" sung by Madhu Balakrishna
 "Nenjil" sung by Ganeshraghu 
 "Ariyaamal"  sung by Chandrayee 
 "Adhisayam" sung by Prasanna (written by Palani Bharathi)
"Takara Takara" sung by Mukesh and Chinnaponnu (written by Palanibharathi)
"Sembattai" sung by Mukesh and Feji (written by Seergazhi Sirpi)

Reception 
Malini Mannath of The New Indian Express wrote that "'Sembattai' at the most is a promising effort of a debutant maker". A critic from The Times of India gave the film a rating of two out of five and opined that "Had the director not beaten around the bush, Sembattai could have been a much better watch".

References

2012 films
Indian drama films
2010s Tamil-language films
2012 drama films